The 2013 Holy Cross Crusaders football team represented the College of the Holy Cross in the 2013 NCAA Division I FCS football season. They were led by tenth-year head coach Tom Gilmore and played their home games at Fitton Field. They were a member of the Patriot League. They finished the season 3–9, 1–4 in Patriot League play to finish in a tie for fifth place.

Schedule

Source: Schedule

References

Holy Cross
Holy Cross Crusaders football seasons
Holy Cross Crusaders football